Acridine is an organic compound and a nitrogen heterocycle with the formula C13H9N. Acridines are substituted derivatives of the parent ring.  It is a planar molecule that is structurally related to anthracene with one of the central CH groups replaced by nitrogen. Like the related molecules pyridine and quinoline, acridine is mildly basic. It is an almost colorless solid, which crystallizes in needles.  There are few commercial applications of acridines; at one time acridine dyes were popular, but they are now relegated to niche applications, such as with acridine orange. The name is a reference to the acrid odour and acrid skin-irritating effect of the compound.

Isolation and syntheses 
Carl Gräbe and Heinrich Caro first isolated acridine in 1870 from coal tar. Acridine is separated from coal tar by extracting with dilute sulfuric acid. Addition of potassium dichromate to this solution precipitates acridine bichromate.  The bichromate is decomposed using ammonia.

Acridine and its derivatives can be prepared by many synthetic processes.  In the Bernthsen acridine synthesis, diphenylamine is condensed with carboxylic acids in the presence of zinc chloride. When formic acid is the carboxylic acid, the reaction yields the parent acridine.  With the higher larger carboxylic acids, the derivatives substituted at the meso carbon atom are generated.

Other older methods for the organic synthesis of acridines include condensing diphenylamine with chloroform in the presence of aluminium chloride, by passing the vapours of orthoaminodiphenylmethane over heated litharge, by heating salicylaldehyde with aniline and zinc chloride  or by distilling acridone (9-position a carbonyl group) over zinc dust.  Another classic method for the synthesis of acridones is the Lehmstedt-Tanasescu reaction.

In enzymology, an acridone synthase is an enzyme that catalyzes the chemical reaction

3 malonyl-CoA + N-methylanthraniloyl-CoA  4 CoA + 1,3-dihydroxy-N-methylacridone + 3 CO2

Thus, the two substrates of this enzyme are malonyl-CoA and N-methylanthraniloyl-CoA, whereas its three products are CoA, 1,3-dihydroxy-N-methylacridone, and CO2.

Reactions
Acridine displays the reactions expected of an unsaturated N-heterocycle.  It undergoes N-alkylation with  alkyl iodides to form alkyl acridinium iodides, which are readily transformed by the action of alkaline potassium ferricyanide to N-alkyl acridones.

Basicity 
Acridine and its homologues are weakly basic. Acridine is a photobase which has a ground state pKa of 5.1, similar to that of pyridine, and an excited state pKa of 10.6. It also shares properties with quinoline.

Reduction and oxidation
Acridines can be reduced to the 9,10-dihydroacridines, sometimes called leucoacridines.  Reaction with potassium cyanide gives the 9-cyano-9,10-dehydro derivative.   On oxidation with potassium permanganate, it yields acridinic acid (C9H5N(CO2H)2) otherwise known as quinoline-1,2-dicarboxylic acid. Acridine is easily oxidized by peroxymonosulfuric acid to the acridine amine oxide. The carbon 9-position of acridine is activated for addition reactions.

Applications
Several dyes and drugs feature the acridine skeleton.  Many acridines, such as proflavine, also have antiseptic properties. Acridine and related derivatives (such as amsacrine) bind to DNA and RNA due to their abilities to intercalate.  Acridine orange (3,6-dimethylaminoacridine) is a nucleic acid-selective metachromatic stain useful for cell cycle determination.

Dyes
At one time acridine dyes were commercially significant, but they are now uncommon because they are not lightfast. Acridine dyes are prepared by condensation of 1,3-diaminobenzene derivatives.  Illustrative is the reaction of 2,4-diaminotoluene with acetaldehyde:

9-Phenylacridine is the parent base of chrysaniline or 3,6-diamino-9-phenylacridine, which is the chief constituent of the dyestuff phosphine (not to be confused with phosphine gas), a byproduct in the manufacture of rosaniline. Chrysaniline forms red-coloured salts, which dye silk and wool in a fine yellow; and the solutions of the salts are characterized by their fine yellowish-green fluorescence.  Chrysaniline was synthesized by O. Fischer and G. Koerner by condensing o-nitrobenzaldehyde with aniline, the resulting o-nitro-p-diaminotriphenylmethane being reduced to the corresponding o-amino compound, which on oxidation yields chrysaniline.

Benzoflavin, an isomer of chrysaniline, is also a dyestuff, and has been prepared by K. Oehler from m-phenylenediamine and benzaldehyde.  These substances condense to form tetraaminotriphenylmethane, which, on heating with acids, loses ammonia and yields 3,6-diamino-9,10-dihydrophenylacridine, from which benzoflavin is obtained by oxidation.  It is a yellow powder, soluble in hot water.

Molecular biology 
Acridine is known to induce small insertions or deletions in nucleotide sequences, resulting in frameshift mutations. This compound was useful to identify the triplet nature of the genetic codes.

Structure
As established by X-ray crystallography, acridine has been obtained in eight polymorphs.  All feature very similar planar molecules with nearly identical bond lengths and bond distances.

Safety
Acridine is a skin irritant.  Its  (rats, oral) is 2,000 mg/kg and 500 mg/kg (mice, oral).

See also
 Lucigenin, a chemiluminescent compound derived from acridine

References

Literature 
 
  [review article dealing with physical properties of acridines, natural products possessing the acridine core, biologically active acridines, applications of acridines, new syntheses and reactions of acridines]

External links

 Synthesis of acridone in Organic Syntheses 19:6; Coll. Vol. 2:15  from o-chlorobenzoic acid and aniline in a Goldberg reaction.
 Synthesis of 9-aminoacridine in Organic Syntheses 22:5; Coll. Vol. 3:53.  from N-phenylanthranilic acid.

 
Simple aromatic rings